Adrian College is a private United Methodist liberal arts college in Adrian, Michigan.  The college offers bachelor's degrees in 92 academic majors and programs. The 100 acre (0.40 km2) campus contains newly constructed facilities along with historic buildings. Adrian College is affiliated with the United Methodist Church and is accredited by the Higher Learning Commission. The spring 2020-21 enrollment was 1,677 students.

History
The college has its origin as a theological institute founded by Wesleyan Methodists at Leoni, Michigan, in 1845. This institution merged with Leoni Seminary, another Methodist school, in 1855 to form Michigan Union College. In 1859, that institution closed and its assets were transferred to Adrian "through the efforts of the antislavery leader and educator, Rev. Asa Mahan, who was elected first president of the new Adrian College". The college was chartered by the Michigan Legislature on March 28, 1859. In the early stages of the Civil War the college volunteered itself as a base for the formation of Michigan regiments for the Union side.  The current Valade Hall building sits on the site of the former base camp for these soldiers.

A marker designating the college as a Michigan Historic Site was erected by the Michigan Historical Commission. The inscription reads:

Chartered on March 28, 1859, Adrian College traces its origins back to a Wesleyan Methodist theological institute founded at Leoni, Michigan in 1845. This institution later became Michigan Union College. Strongly antislavery in its sentiments, the school was moved to Adrian in 1859 through the efforts of the antislavery leader and educator, Rev. Asa Mahan, who was elected first president of the new Adrian College. The college was transferred to the Methodist Protestant Church in 1868, and here for 71 years, leaders of this denomination were trained. In 1939 a denominational union of American Methodism resulted in the establishment of the Methodist Church. Adrian College is affiliated with this great church body.

An additional marker commemorating Camp Williams and the Fourth Michigan Volunteer Infantry as a Michigan Historic Site was erected by the  Michigan Historical Commission. The inscriptions read:

Camp Williams
At the outbreak of the Civil War in early 1861, the trustees of Adrian College offered the use of campus buildings and grounds to the Fourth Michigan Volunteer Infantry for training. This became known as Camp Williams. The city of Adrian donated money to build a mess and dining hall. By early June ten companies of the Fourth had arrived and started their training. The 1,025 soldiers came from Adrian, Ann Arbor, Dexter, Jonesville, Hudson, Sturgis, Monroe, Hillsdale, Tecumseh, and Trenton. On June 21 nearly 30,000 people came to town to see the Fourth depart for Washington. The ladies of Adrian presented Colonel Dwight Woodbury with the regimental flag. Sewn into the flag was "The Ladies of Adrian to the Fourth regiment Defend It."

Fourth Michigan Volunteer Infantry
In spring 1861 the Fourth Michigan Volunteer Infantry departed Adrians' Camp Williams for service in the Civil War. The regiment was assigned to the Army of the Potomac and saw action in forty-one engagements, including Gaines Mills, Fredericksburg, Chancellorsville, and Petersburg. The Fourth was one of the few regiments to lose more men in battle than from disease. Out of 1,399 men, 307 died from May 1862 through June 1864. Three colonels died in battle defending their regimental flag: Dwight Woodbury, at Malvern Hill, Virginia; Harrison Jeffords in The Wheatfield at Gettysburg; and George Lumbard at The Wilderness, Virginia. In 1864 the reorganized Fourth trained here, at Camp Williams, once more.

Campus

The original campus was built in the mid-19th century. It would be almost a century later that President John Dawson began a major construction phase of the campus, including most of the residence halls, academic buildings, a student union, and the administration building. More recently, current President Jeff Docking has introduced many plans to revitalize Adrian College and its campus, including the construction of new buildings, renovation of old ones, and programs related to athletics. Many of these initiatives are grouped under his "Renaissance I and II Projects" and include the new facilities such as: Arrington Ice Arena, a Multi-Sport Performance (Football) Stadium, Ritchie Marketplace (Dining Hall) Expansion, Athletic Training Laboratory & Human Performance Lab, College View North Apartments, Indoor Baseball & Softball Practice Facility, Terrace at Caine Student Center, and a new Grounds and Maintenance Facility. The college has also undertaken extensive renovation projects which include: the renovation of Rush Hall into a state-of-the-art million dollar multimedia facility, Robinson Planetarium renovations, Peelle 207 Lecture Hall, Spencer Hall Center for Music, Downs Hall (the oldest and most historic building on campus) and the current renovation and upgrade of Jones Hall (Business) and Peelle Hall (Science).

The details of Adrian College's growth since 2005 are chronicled in Dr. Docking's recently published book, Crisis in Education: A Plan to Save Small Liberal Arts Colleges in America. 

The college is making renovations and expansions to the Science, Business, Visual Arts, and Performing Arts departments.

Academics
Adrian College offers over 90 majors and pre-professional programs.  It also offers six graduate programs using a unique 4+1 structure for current students.  Graduate programs exist in: Accounting, Athletic Training, Criminal Justice,  Industrial Chemistry, Teacher Education, and Sports Administration and Leadership. Its most popular majors, as of 2021 graduates, were:
Marketing/Marketing Management (35)
Sports & Fitness Administration/Management (30)
Biology/Biological Sciences (27)
Exercise Science & Kinesiology (25)
Business Administration & Management (23)

Over the past several years eight of the nine academic buildings were renovated, and fundraising is currently being undertaken on the final building, Mahan Hall for Art and Interior Design.  The following renovations have taken place since 2008: Rush Hall for Communication Arts, Goldsmith Hall for Modern Languages and Cultures, Spencer Hall for Music, Herrick Chapel, Jones Hall for Business and Humanities, Peelle Hall for Mathematics and Natural Science, Valade Hall for social sciences and humanities, and a historic renovation of the oldest building on campus, Downs Hall for theatre, built in 1860.

Institutes
Institutes are thematic centers focusing on areas of interest supporting the mission of Adrian College.  , there are eight institutes including Career Planning, Creativity, Entrepreneurial Studies, Ethics, Health Studies, Romney Institute for Law and Public Policy, Study Abroad, Sports Medicine, and Teacher Education.  Each institute provides programming to students, faculty, staff, and wider community.

Student activities

Athletics
Adrian College athletic teams, nicknamed the "Bulldogs," are part of the Michigan Intercollegiate Athletic Association and the National Collegiate Athletic Association Division III.  The men's NCAA Division III hockey team is a member of the Northern Collegiate Hockey Association. The men's volleyball team joined the Midwest Collegiate Volleyball League. Adrian College is the third college or university to offer women's hockey as a varsity sport in Michigan.  In 2011, the College reached an agreement with the federal Department of Education's Office of Civil Rights, resolving complaints that the College had violated Title IX. The College was found guilty of eleven violations of the law that governs gender equality, and agreed to make several changes to its athletic programs.  Adrian College offers the following varsity sports:
 Baseball
 Basketball (Men / Women)
 Bass Fishing
 Bowling (Men/Women)
 Cheerleading (Co-ed)
 Cornhole (Men/Women) Fall 2022
 Cross country (Men/Women)
 Dance squad
 eSports
 Figure Skating
 Football
 Equestrian
 Golf (Men / Women)
 Ice hockey (Men / Women)
 Lacrosse (Men / Women)
 Rowing (Men/Women)
 Rugby (Men/Women) Fall 2021
 Soccer (Men / Women)
 Softball
 Synchronized skating
 Tennis (Men / Women)
 Track and field (Men/Women)
 Volleyball (Men/Women) 
 Wrestling (Men/Women)

Adrian expanded its athletic programs in the 2007–2008 academic year to add NCAA Division III men's and women's ice hockey and men's Division I ACHA hockey along with synchronized skating and NCAA Division III men's and women's lacrosse. The Bulldog's lacrosse program is the first varsity program in MI since the induction of Title IX. Women's bowling was added for the 2008-2009 year. Later, it added men's and women's rowing in 2018.

Men's ice hockey
The men's Division III team received national attention on the eve of Selection Sunday of the 2007–08 season on ESPN's "The Sports Reporters" as Mitch Albom, columnist from the Detroit Free Press, used his closing remarks to highlight the remarkable ride of the hockey team's season (their first at the NCAA level).  The team finished 26-3 and did not make the NCAA Division III Tournament. They would qualify for the NCAA National Tournament nine times before winning their first NCAA Div. III National Championship on March 26th, 2022 in Lake Placid, New York. 

Adrian College is home to the largest hockey program in the country, fielding Men's and Women's NCAA DIII teams, ACHA Men's D1, D2 and D3 teams along with ACHA Women's D1 and D2 teams.

The ACHA D3 team is the only ACHA D3 team to win 3 consecutive ACHA MD3 National Championships in 2012, 2013 and 2014. The 2012 MD3 National Championship was the school's first national championship in any sport in its 153-year history. The Men's ACHA D1 team went on to win the 2018 ACHA MD1 National Championship in 2018 and 2021.

Men's and women's rowing
On March 30, 2017, Adrian College athletic director, Michael Duffy, announced that men's and women's rowing would be added. On May 22, 2018, Adrian College's new rowing programs joined the Mid-Atlantic Rowing Conference (MARC). On August 6, 2018, the program welcomed an inaugural freshman class of 25 rowers. In their first season in the MARC, the men's team finished eighth out of twenty, while the women placed sixth out of eleven.

Football

College football has been a part of the history of Adrian college since 1892, when Hillsdale College defeated Adrian by a score of 56–0.  The first head football coach on record was E. E. Tarr in 1903.  Since then, the program has won 16 conference championships, the first in 1911 and the most recent in 2012 and 2014. The head coach is Jim Deere who took over in 2010.

Intramural sports
Intramurals are part of Adrian College and the athletic department. Some of the intramural teams include Flag Football, 5-on-5 Basketball, Coed Volleyball League, Broomball, 7-on-7 Soccer, and 3-on-3 Basketball.

Fraternities and sororities
Greek life on campus includes five nationally recognized fraternities: Alpha Tau Omega, Pi Kappa Alpha, Theta Chi, Sigma Alpha Epsilon and Tau Kappa Epsilon. There are three nationally recognized sororities: Alpha Phi, Alpha Sigma Alpha, and Chi Omega. There is one locally recognized sorority, Delta Nu Kappa.

Notable alumni
 Lucien Baker, United States Senator from Kansas (1866)
 Virgil Bernero, mayor of Lansing and the 2010 Democratic nominee for governor in Michigan (1986)
 John E. Bird, member of the Michigan Supreme Court (1892)
 Rube Kisinger, pitcher for the Detroit Tigers
 James Laird, former Republican U.S. Representative of Nebraska's 2nd congressional district
 Mike Lewis, defensive end for the Iowa Barnstormers of the Arena Football League (2006).
 John Maulbetsch, College Football Hall of Fame member (1911)
 Mike Rogers, former Republican U.S. Representative of Michigan's 8th congressional district (1985)
 Henry C. Smith, former Republican U.S. Representative of Michigan's 2nd congressional district (1878)

References

External links

 Official website
 Official athletics website

 
Liberal arts colleges in Michigan
Adrian, Michigan
Education in Lenawee County, Michigan
Educational institutions established in 1859
Buildings and structures in Lenawee County, Michigan
Tourist attractions in Lenawee County, Michigan
1859 establishments in Michigan
Private universities and colleges in Michigan